This is a partial list of canyons in the U.S. state of Utah along with any rivers, roads, and other features (such as rail lines) that pass through them.

See also

External links

 
Canyons
Utah